"Sare Jahan se Accha" (Sāre Jahāṉ se Acchā), formally known as "Tarānah-e-Hindi" (Urdu: , "Anthem of the People of Hindustan"), is an Urdu language patriotic song for children written by poet Allama Muhammad Iqbal in the ghazal style of Urdu poetry. The poem was published in the weekly journal Ittehad on 16 August 1904. Publicly recited by Iqbal the following year at Government College, Lahore, British India (now in Pakistan) it quickly became an anthem of opposition to the British Raj. The song, an ode to Hindustan—the land comprising present-day Bangladesh, India and Pakistan, was later published in 1924 in the Urdu book Bang-i-Dara.

The song has remained popular, but only in India. An abridged version is sung and played frequently as a patriotic song and as a marching song of the Indian Armed Forces.

Text of poem

English translation 
Better than the entire world, is our Hindustan,
We are its nightingales, and it (is) our garden abode
 
If we are in an alien place, the heart remains in the homeland,
consider us too [to be] right there where our heart would be.
 
That tallest mountain, that shade-sharer of the sky,
It (is) our sentry, it (is) our watchman
 
In its lap where frolic thousands of rivers,
Whose vitality makes our garden the envy of Paradise.
 
O the flowing waters of the Ganges, do you remember that day
When our caravan first disembarked on your waterfront?
 
Religion does not teach us to bear animosity among ourselves
We are of Hind, our homeland is Hindustan.
 
In a world in which ancient Greece, Egypt, and Rome have all vanished
Our own attributes (name and sign) live on today.
 
There is something about our existence for it doesn't get wiped 
Even though, for centuries, the time-cycle of the world has been our enemy.
 
Iqbal! We have no confidant in this world
What does any one know of our hidden pain?

Composition
Iqbal was a lecturer at the Government College, Lahore at that time, and was invited by a student Lala Har Dayal to preside over a function. Instead of delivering a speech, Iqbal sang "Saare Jahan Se Achcha".  The song, in addition to embodying yearning and attachment to the land of Hindustan, expressed "cultural memory" and had an elegiac quality.  In 1905, the 27-year-old Iqbal viewed the future society of the subcontinent as both a pluralistic and composite Hindu-Muslim culture.  Later that year he left for Europe for a three-year sojourn that was to transform him into an Islamic philosopher and a visionary of a future Islamic society.

Iqbal's transformation and Tarana-e-Milli

In 1910, Iqbal wrote another song for children, "Tarana-e-Milli" (Anthem of the Religious Community), which was composed in the same metre and rhyme scheme as "Saare Jahan Se Achcha", but which renounced much of the sentiment of the earlier song. The sixth stanza of "Saare Jahan Se Achcha" (1904), which is often quoted as proof of Iqbal's secular outlook:

contrasted significantly with the first stanza of Tarana-e-Milli (1910) reads:

Iqbal's world view had now changed; it had become both global and Islamic.  Instead of singing of Hindustan, "our homeland," the new song proclaimed that "our homeland is the whole world." Two decades later, in his presidential address to the Muslim League annual conference in Allahabad in 1930, he supported a separate nation-state in the Muslim majority areas of the sub-continent, an idea that inspired the creation of Pakistan.

Popularity in India
 Saare Jahan Se Achcha has remained popular in India for nearly a century. Mahatma Gandhi is said to have sung it over a hundred times when he was imprisoned at Yerawada Jail in Pune in the 1930s.
 In the 1930s and 1940s, it was sung to a slower tune. In 1945, while working in Mumbai with the Indian People's Theatre Association (IPTA), the sitarist Pandit Ravi Shankar was asked to compose the music for the K. A. Abbas film  Dharti Ke Lal and the Chetan Anand movie Neecha Nagar. During this time, Ravi Shankar was asked to compose music for the song "Saare Jahan se Accha". In an interview in 2009 with Shekhar Gupta, Ravi Shankar recounts that he felt that the existing tune was too slow and sad. To give it a more inspiring impact, he set it to a stronger tune which is today the popular tune of this song, which they then tried out as a group song. It was later recorded by the singer Lata Mangeshkar to a 3rd altogether different tune.  Stanzas (1), (3), (4), and (6) of the song became an unofficial national song in India, and the Ravi Shankar version was adopted as the official quick march of the Indian Armed Forces.  This arrangement as marching tune of this song was made by Antsher Lobo.
 Rakesh Sharma, the first Indian astronaut, employed the first line of the song in 1984 to describe to then prime minister Indira Gandhi how India appeared from outer space. 
 In his inaugural speech, the former prime minister of India Manmohan Singh quoted this poem at his first press conference after becoming the Prime Minister.
 The song is popular in India in schools as a patriotic song, sung during morning assemblies, and as a marching song for the Indian armed forces, played during public events and parades.  It is played by the Armed forces Massed Bands each year for the Indian Independence Day, Republic Day and at the culmination of Beating the Retreat.

Text in the Devanagari script
In India, the text of the poem is often rendered in the Devanagari script of Hindi:

See also 
 Index of Muhammad Iqbal–related articles
Iqbal bibliography
Amar Shonar Bangla
Jana Gana Mana
Vande Mataram
National Pledge (India)

Notes and references

Notes

Citations

External links
 (Children singing the complete lyrics of the song.)

Poetry by Muhammad Iqbal
Indian patriotic songs
Indian poems
Indian culture
Literature of Indian independence movement
Muhammad Iqbal
Urdu-language words and phrases
1904 songs
Indian military marches